Xibeiwang Area is an area and a town on the northeast of Haidian District, Beijing, China. It borders Shigezhuang Subdistrict, Shahe and Shangzhuang Towns to its north, Huilongguan, Qinghe, Shangdi and Malianwa Subdistricts to its east, Qinglongqiao and Xiangshan Subdistricts to its south, Wenquan and Sujiatuo Towns to its west. The population of Xibeiwangg was 164,795 in 2020. 

The name Xibeiwang is a corruption of Xibaiwang, a name of this region given for its location west of Baiwang Mountain. The mountain, in turn, gets its name for the fact that its peak can supposedly still be visible from a hundred Chinese miles away.

History

Administrative Divisions 
As of 2021, Xibeiwang Area included 32 subdivisions, with 17 being communities, 8 being villages and 7 being residential areas for stock economic cooperatives:

See also 

 List of township-level divisions of Beijing

References 

Haidian District
Towns in Beijing
Areas of Beijing